Wolfgang Schutzbar genannt Milchling ( – 11 February 1566) was the 39th Grand Master of the Teutonic Order, serving from 1543 to 1566.

Schitzbar hailed from the family of Schutzbar genannt Milchling from Hesse. He joined the Teutonic Order in 1507 and was from 1529 to 1543 Komtur of the Bally of Hesse at Marburg.

In 1543, he became Hochmeister and Deutschmeister, a combined office located at Mergentheim. There, he built the first town hall in 1564, and the first water supply.

A monument dedicated to him is found at the local Market Square.

His coat of arms shows three hearts meeting in the center of the shield.

See also
Schutzbar genannt Milchling

References
Der Deutsche Orden in Hessen. Ausstellung des Hessischen Staatsarchivs Marburg, bearb. von Hans-Peter Lachmann, Marburg, 1983, S. 97.
Hermann, A., Wolfgang Schutzbar genannt Milchling, in: Udo Arnold (Hg.), Die Hochmeister des Deutschen Ordens (=QuStDO 40), Marburg, 1996.

Grand Masters of the Teutonic Order
1483 births
1566 deaths